Choirboy is a boy member of a choir, also known as a treble

Choirboy and variants may also refer to:
 Choir Boy, a Broadway play
Choir Boy (band), an alternative rock / dream-pop band from Salt Lake City
Choirboys (album), debut album of the Australian rock band The Choirboys
The Choirboys (book), a 1975 novel by Joseph Wambaugh
The Choirboys (film), a 1977 film adaptation of the novel starring Perry King
The Choirboys (band), an Australian hard rock band
The Choirboys (boyband), a British boyband of cathedral choristers
 The Choirboys, the early name of British rock band The Quireboys